Elena Dache (born 24 March 1997) is a Romanian handball player for Dunărea Brăila and the Romanian national team.

She represented Romania at the 2019 World Women's Handball Championship.

References

External links

1997 births
Living people
Sportspeople from Galați
Romanian female handball players